Josef Rehm (1902 – 1 July 1944) was a German skier. He competed in the military patrol at the 1928 Summer Olympics. He was killed in action during World War II.

References

External links

1902 births
1944 deaths
Date of birth missing
Place of birth missing
Place of death missing
German military patrol (sport) runners
Military patrol competitors at the 1928 Winter Olympics
German Army personnel killed in World War II
Missing in action of World War II
Winter Olympics competitors for Germany